Purple Noon (also known as Full Sun, Blazing Sun, Lust for Evil, and Talented Mr. Ripley) is a 1960 crime thriller film starring Alain Delon in his first major film, along with Maurice Ronet (as Philippe Greenleaf) and Marie Laforêt (as Marge).

Directed by René Clément, the French/Italian international co-production is loosely based on the 1955 novel The Talented Mr. Ripley by Patricia Highsmith. The film, principally in French, contains brief sequences in Italian and English.

Billy Kearns (an expatriate American actor well-liked in France) plays Greenleaf's friend Freddy Miles, and Romy Schneider appears briefly in an uncredited role as Freddie Miles' companion.

Highsmith's source novel was adapted again in 1999 under the original title, The Talented Mr. Ripley.

Plot
Handsome young American Tom Ripley (Alain Delon) has been sent to Italy by the father of wealthy playboy Philippe Greenleaf (Maurice Ronet) to persuade him to return to San Francisco and take over the family business. Philippe has no intention of doing so, and the impoverished Tom falls into sharing in his escapades.

Tom becomes fixated on Philippe and his fiance, Marge (Marie Laforêt), and covets the other man's life of luxury. Philippe eventually grows bored with Ripley's fawning and becomes cruel and abusive to him. The final straw for Tom is reached during a yachting trip when Philippe strands him in the dinghy and accidentally leaves him to lie adrift in the sun for hours.

Back on board, Tom hatches a plan to kill Philippe and steal his identity. First, he leaves evidence of Philippe's philandering for an outraged Marge to find. Finding that Tom has pilfered his banking records, Philippe seeks to draw him out.  After Marge goes ashore following a blow-up with Philippe, he confronts Tom, who admits his plan quite casually. Suddenly frightened, Philippe offers Tom a substantial sum to leave him and Marge alone, but Tom rebuffs it, saying he is interested in far more. He stabs Philippe, weights his body with an anchor, wraps it in canvas, and casts it loose.

Upon returning ashore alone, Tom informs Marge that Philippe has decided to stay behind. He then returns to Rome, forges his picture onto Philippe’s passport, masters his signature, and successfully absorbs the man’s wealth, identity, and lifestyle. 

When Philippe's friend Freddie Miles (Billy Kearns) tracks down "Philippe's" hideaway he encounters only Tom.  He begins to suspect the truth and Tom murders him as well. Freddie's body is soon found and the Italian police become involved. Tom continues his charade, switching like a chameleon between his identity and Philippe's, depending on what the situation demands. Winging a scheme to implicate Philippe in Freddie's murder, Tom then forges a suicide note and a will, leaving Philippe’s fortune to Marge.

Tom survives a long string of close shaves, throwing the Italian police off his trail and seemingly having outwitted everyone. He goes on to seduce Marge, dallying with her in Philippe's island home. Philippe's father arrives to settle the transfer of Philippe's estate, but she and Tom are swimming at the beach.  When Philippe's yacht is being pulled out of the water for inspection by a buyer, Marge is called to attend. Philippe stays behind to celebrate the success of his gambit, ordering the best drink in the house at a nearby cafe.

At the boatyard Marge is horrified to see a canvas-wrapped body dragged up the ways behind the yacht, the loose end of its lashing having fouled around the sailboat’s propeller. Meanwhile, a police detective from Rome who has been stalking Tom the whole time has closed in on him.  Still unaware of the grisly discovery he uses the ruse of a phone call for Tom to draw him directly into his clutches.

Cast 
 Alain Delon as Tom Ripley
 Maurice Ronet as Philippe Greenleaf
 Marie Laforêt as Marge Duval
 Erno Crisa as Inspector Riccordi
 Billy Kearns as Freddy Miles
 Frank Latimore as O'Brien
 Elvire Popesco as Madame Popova
 Nicolas Petrov as Boris the dancer
 Ave Ninchi as Signora Gianna, landlady in Rome
 Lily Romanelli as Greenleaf's Housekeeper in Mongibello
 Nerio Bernardi as the Ship's Agency Director
  as The Belgian Lady
 Paul Muller as The Blind Man (uncredited)
 René Clément as a servant (uncredited cameo appearance)
 Romy Schneider as Freddy's companion (uncredited cameo appearance; Schneider was Delon's girlfriend at that time)

Production
Delon was cast after the director saw him in Women Are Weak (1959).

Screenwriter Paul Gégauff wrote a variation on the same story in 1968 when he worked on Les biches for Claude Chabrol.

Reception
Purple Noon was lauded by critics, and made Delon a star. In 1962, Clément and Paul Gégauff won an Edgar Award from the Mystery Writers of America for Best Foreign Film Screenplay. It enjoys a loyal cult following even today, with fans including film director Martin Scorsese.

Roger Ebert gave Purple Noon three stars (compared to the four-star review he gave to the 1999 version, The Talented Mr. Ripley), writing that "the best thing about the film is the way the plot devises a way for Ripley to create a perfect cover-up", but criticized the "less than satisfactory ending", feeling that "Purple Noon ends as it does only because Clement doesn't have Highsmith's iron nerve".

James Berardinelli rated Purple Noon higher than The Talented Mr. Ripley, giving it a four-star review (compared to two and a half stars for The Talented Mr. Ripley). Berardinelli praised Delon's acting, saying that "Tom is fascinating because Delon makes him so" and also complimented the film for "expert camerawork and crisp direction." Berardinelli placed Purple Noon on his All-Time 100 list and compared it to the 1999 film: "The remake went back to the source material, Patricia Highsmith's The Talented Mr. Ripley. The result, while arguably truer to the events of Highsmith's book, is vastly inferior. To say it suffers by comparison to Purple Noon is an understatement. Almost every aspect of Rene Clement's 1960 motion picture is superior to that of Minghella's 1999 version, from the cinematography to the acting to the screenplay. Matt Damon might make a credible Tom Ripley but only for those who never experienced Alain Delon's portrayal." Nandini Ramnath wrote for Scroll.in, "The definitive portrayal of crime novelist Patricia Highsmith's most enduring creation was as early as 1960. Damon and Hopper come close to conveying the ruthlessness and ambition of Tom Ripley, but Delon effortless captures his mystique."

Highsmith's opinion of the film was mixed. She felt that Alain Delon was "excellent" in the role of Tom Ripley and described the film overall as "very beautiful to the eye and interesting for the intellect", but criticized the ending in which it is implied that Ripley is to be caught by the police: "[I]t was a terrible concession to so-called public morality that the criminal had to be caught."

The Japanese filmmaker Akira Kurosawa cited this movie as one of his 100 favorite films.

Restoration and re-release
In 2012 StudioCanal funded a restoration of the movie by the  laboratory. The restored version was to be shown at the 2013 Cannes Film Festival as part of an homage to Delon's career, prior to re-release in France at least.

On 4 December 2012, The Criterion Collection released the high-definition digital restoration of Purple Noon on Blu-ray and DVD. Special features include an interview with René Clément scholar and author Denitza Bantcheva, archival interviews with Alain Delon and Patricia Highsmith, the film's original English-language trailer, a booklet featuring an essay by film critic Geoffrey O'Brien, and excerpts from a 1981 interview with Clément. The film has also been released on Blu-ray in the UK and Germany (Studiocanal, 2013), and Japan (Kinokuniya, 2011).

References

External links
 
 
 
 
 Purple Noon: In Broad Sunlight, an essay by Geoffrey O'Brien at The Criterion Collection
 Article about the yacht Marge at Sea Independent

1960 films
1960 crime films
1960 crime drama films
1960s crime thriller films
1960s psychological thriller films
1960s thriller drama films
Edgar Award-winning works
Films about con artists
Films about identity theft
Films based on American crime novels
Films based on works by Patricia Highsmith
Films directed by René Clément
Films produced by Robert and Raymond Hakim
Films scored by Nino Rota
Films set in Rome
Films set in the Mediterranean Sea
Films shot in Naples
Films shot in Rome
Films with screenplays by Paul Gégauff
French crime drama films
French crime thriller films
1960s French-language films
French psychological thriller films
Italian crime drama films
Italian crime thriller films
Italian thriller drama films
Italian psychological thriller films
Seafaring films
Titanus films
1960s Italian films
1960s French films
French-language Italian films